STARStreet* is a British children's television series, starring the pop group allSTARS*. The 'STARS' in allSTARS* and STARStreet* represents the first letter of each member's name – Sandi, Thaila, Ashley, Rebecca and Sam. The series saw the band living together in a fictional crazy colourful house, where anything out of the ordinary could happen. It was produced for two series by Carlton Television, in association with Byrne Blood Productions. The first series first aired as part of the ITV children's Saturday morning show, SMTV Live in 2001. Due to its success, the first series was later repeated on CITV. The second series aired on CITV in 2002. Production of STARStreet* was cancelled in 2002 due to the allSTARS* splitting up.

Media releases

STARStreet* – Vol.1: Best Friends (VHS) 
Best Friends
Lost Little Things
Butterflies
Deja Vu
The Greatest Love Story
 + The Making of STARStreet featurette.

STARStreet* – Vol.2: Thaila's Birthday (VHS) 
Thaila's Birthday
Cold Sweat
Ashley's Head
The Wrong Side

The remaining four episodes of the first series, along with the entire second series, were never released onto VHS. To date, there have been no releases on DVD.

Episodes

Series 1 (2001)
Best Friends
Lost Little Things
Cold Sweat
Butterflies
Déjà Vu	Found
Thaila's Birthday
The Greatest Love Story
Inside Ashley's Head
Makeover Madness
The Hot Ticket
The Wrong Side
Becky Who?
Happy Ever After

Series 2 (2002)
Tiny Planet
Ba Da Bing
Back to the Future
Shop Till You Drop
Pants on Fire
Reality TV
Spin Cycle
Video Nasty
Ask Ash	Lost
Time Out

References

External links

2001 British television series debuts
2002 British television series endings
2000s British children's television series
Carlton Television
ITV children's television shows
Television series by ITV Studios
English-language television shows